Cho Hyung-gon (born 23 June 1990 in Uijeongbu) is a South Korean ice hockey defenceman currently playing for Anyang Halla of Asia League Ice Hockey (ALIH). He competed at the 2018 Winter Olympics.

References

External links
 

1990 births
Living people
Ice hockey players at the 2018 Winter Olympics
South Korean ice hockey defencemen
Olympic ice hockey players of South Korea
HL Anyang players
Competitors at the 2011 Winter Universiade
People from Uijeongbu
Sportspeople from Gyeonggi Province
21st-century South Korean people